Muhammad Hussayn ibn Muhammad Hadi al-‘Aqili al-‘Alavi al-Khurasani al-Shirazi was a Persian physician from the 18th century from Shiraz. 

Muhammad Husayn ibn Muhammad Hadi, known as Hakim Muhammad Hadikhan, is mostly known for two Persian compendia on simple and compound remedies: Majma‘ al-javami‘ va-zakha'ir al-tarakib, which he composed in 1771 and based largely upon a treatise titled Jami‘ al-javami‘ by his great-uncle Alavi Khan, and the Makhzan al-adviyah which is a verbatim reproduction of the alphabetical pharmacopeia in the Jami‘ al-javami‘ of his great uncle. 

Muhammad Hadikhan also composed a number of smaller medical treatises, among them a treatise on smallpox.

See also
List of Iranian scientists

Sources
For his life and writings, see: 
C.A. Storey, Persian Literature: A Bio-Bibliographical Survey. Volume II, Part 2: E.Medicine (London: Royal Asiatic Society, 1971), pp 280–3 no 492
Fateme Keshavarz, A Descriptive and Analytical Catalogue of Persian Manuscripts in the Library of the Wellcome Institute for the History of Medicine (London: Wellcome Institute for the History of Medicine, 1986), pp 281–2 no 136 and 262-3 no 125.

18th-century Iranian physicians